The South Korean women's national under-16 and under-17 basketball team is a national basketball team of South Korea and is governed by the Korea Basketball Association.
It represents the country in international under-16 and under-17 (under age 16 and under age 17) women's basketball competitions.

World Cup results

See also
South Korea women's national basketball team
South Korea women's national under-19 basketball team
South Korea men's national under-17 basketball team

References

External links

Women's national under-17 basketball teams
Basketball